The Department of Health is the department of the Basque Government responsible for the community's public health care system.

Ministers 
 
 1936-1937: Alfredo Espinosa
 1937-1946: Heliodoro de la Torre
 1946-1951: Manuel Campomanes
 1951-1978: Cárlos Pérez Carranza
 
 1978-1980: Andoni Monforte
 
 1980-1984: Jesus Javier Agirre
 1984-1985: Angel Larrañaga
 1985-1987: Jon Imanol Azua
 1987-1991: Jose Manuel Freire
 1991-1999: Iñaki Azkuna
 1999-2009: Gabriel Maria Inclan
 2009-2012: Rafael Bengoa
 2012-2019: Jon Darpon
 2019-2020: Nekane Murga
 2020-: Gotzone Sagardui

See also 
 List of health departments and ministries

External links 
  
  

Basque Government
Basque Country